Gataka may refer to:

A spelling variation for Gatka, the martial art of the Sikhs.
Gataka, the scene name of the Israeli DJ Matan Kadosh, also famous for participating in psytrance trio Sesto Sento.

See also
Gattaca
Gatka (disambiguation)